Scabrotrophon is a genus of sea snails, marine gastropod mollusks in the subfamily Trophoninae ( of the family Muricidae, the murex snails or rock snails.

Species
Species within the genus Scabrotrophon include:
 Scabrotrophon bondarevi (Houart, 1995)
 Scabrotrophon buldirensis Houart, Vermeij & Wiedrick, 2019
 Scabrotrophon callosus (Nomura & Hatai, 1940)
 Scabrotrophon cerritensis (Arnold, 1903)
 Scabrotrophon chunfui Houart & Lan, 2001
 Scabrotrophon clarki McLean, 1996
 Scabrotrophon densicostatus (Golikov in Golikov & Scarlato, 1985)
 Scabrotrophon densilamellatus (Golikov & Gulbin, 1977)
 Scabrotrophon emphaticus (Habe & Ito, 1965)
 Scabrotrophon fabricii (Møller, 1842)
 Scabrotrophon grovesi McLean, 1996
 Scabrotrophon hawaiiensis Houart & Moffitt, 2010
 Scabrotrophon inspiratus Houart, 2003
 Scabrotrophon kantori Houart, Vermeij & Wiedrick, 2019
 Scabrotrophon lani Houart & Liang, 2004
 Scabrotrophon lasius (Dall, 1919)
 Scabrotrophon lima Houart, Vermeij & Wiedrick, 2019
 Scabrotrophon macleani Houart, Vermeij & Wiedrick, 2019
 Scabrotrophon maestratii Houart & Héros, 2016
 Scabrotrophon maltzani (Kobelt,1878)
 Scabrotrophon manai Houart & Héros, 2016
 Scabrotrophon maranii Houart & Héros, 2016
 Scabrotrophon moresbyensis Houart, Vermeij & Wiedrick, 2019
 Scabrotrophon nodulosus (Golikov, in Golikov & Scarlato, 1985)
 Scabrotrophon norafosterae Houart, Vermeij & Wiedrick, 2019
 Scabrotrophon puillandrei Houart & Héros, 2016
 Scabrotrophon regina (Houart, 1985)
 Scabrotrophon rossicus (Egorov, 1993)
 Scabrotrophon scarlatoi (Golikov & Sirenko, 1992)
 Scabrotrophon scitulus (Dall, 1891)
 Scabrotrophon stuarti (E. A. Smith, 1880)
 Scabrotrophon tegularis (Golikov & Gulbin, 1977)
 Scabrotrophon trifidus Houart, Vermeij & Wiedrick, 2019
 Scabrotrophon undocostatus (Golikov & Sirenko, 1992)
 Scabrotrophon yurii (Egorov, 1994)
Species brought into synonymy
 Scabrotrophon kamchatkanus (Dall, 1902): synonym of Boreotrophon kamchatkanus Dall, 1902

References

 McLean J.H. (1996). The Prosobranchia. In: Taxonomic Atlas of the Benthic Fauna of the Santa Maria Basin and Western Santa Barbara Channel. The Mollusca Part 2 – The Gastropoda. Santa Barbara Museum of Natural History. volume 9: 1-160.

 
Trophoninae